Jin Yubo (born 1987) is a Chinese ski mountaineer, and member of the national selection of the People's Republic of China. He studies at Shenyang Sport University in Shenyang.

Selected results 
 2009:
 2nd, Asian Championship, individual
 2nd, Asian Championship, relay (mixed teams), together with Cui Xiaodi, Huang Chunsen and  Xin Detao
 8th, Asian Championship, vertical race

External links 
 Jin Yubo, skimountaineering.org

References 

1987 births
Living people
Chinese male ski mountaineers